Santolaya de Vixil is a parish (administrative division) in Siero, a municipality within the province and autonomous community of Asturias, in northern Spain.

Villages

References

Parishes in Siero